The Secret of the Universe (1991) is a collection of seventeen scientific essays by American writer and scientist Isaac Asimov. It is the twenty-second and final of a series of books collecting essays from The Magazine of Fantasy & Science Fiction (F&SF). Asimov died in 1992.

The 22 books collect 373 of Asimov's 399 essays for the magazine.

Contents
 "The Cosmic Lens" (February 1989)
 "The Secret of the Universe" (March 1989)
 "The Moon's Twin" (April 1989)
 "The Changing Distance" (May 1989)
 "A Change of Air" (June 1989)
 "The Importance of Pitch" (July 1989)
 "Long Ago and Far Away" (August 1989)
 "The True Rulers" (September 1989)
 "The Nearest Star" (October 1989)
 "Massing the Sun" (November 1989)
 "What Are Little Stars Made Of?" (December 1989)
 "Hot, Cold, and Con Fusion" (January 1990)
 "Business as Usual" (February 1990)
 "Smashing the Sky" (March 1990)
 "Worlds in Order" (April 1990)
 "Just Say 'No'?" (May 1990)
 "The Salt-Producers" (June 1990)

References

External links
Asimovreviews.net

Essay collections by Isaac Asimov
1991 non-fiction books
Works originally published in The Magazine of Fantasy & Science Fiction
Doubleday (publisher) books
Essay collections